John Hannibal White (1828 – July 26, 1878) was a delegate to South Carolina's 1868 Constitutional Convention, a two-term member of the South Carolina House of Representatives, and a state senator in South Carolina. He worked as a blacksmith.

White was enslaved from birth.

During the Civil War he would read updates to members of his community in York County, South Carolina. A photograph of him was part of a composite image of African American "Radical Republican" members of the South Carolina Legislature.

Additional reading
South Carolina Negro Legislators: a Glorious Success: State and Local Officeholders; Biographies of Negro Representatives, 1868–1902 by Lawrence Chesterfield Bryant, South Carolina State College, 1974
Biographical Directory of the South Carolina House of Representatives; Faunt, J.S.R. and Rector, R.E., with Bowden, D.K. Session lists, 1692–1973 by Walter B. Edgar, N. Louise Bailey, University of South Carolina Press, 1974

References

1828 births
1878 deaths
Republican Party members of the South Carolina House of Representatives
Republican Party South Carolina state senators
People from York County, South Carolina
Radical Republican Party politicians
African-American politicians during the Reconstruction Era